These are the list of personnel changes in the NBA from the 1959–60 NBA season.

Trade

Free Agency

Selling

Waived

References
NBA Transactions at NBA.com
1959-60 NBA Transactions| Basketball-Reference.com

Transactions
NBA transactions